Diprionomys is an extinct genus of Heteromyidae that existed in the United States during the Late Miocene period.

References

Heteromyidae
Miocene rodents
Neogene mammals of North America
Fossil taxa described in 1910